John Herbert Warner (26 November 1923 – 20 September 1991) was a member of the Queensland Legislative Assembly.

Biography
Warner was born in Sydney, New South Wales, the son of A.F. Warner and his wife Elizabeth Hazel (née Hollis) and was educated at The King's School, Parramatta. He worked as a farmer and grazier and in World War II served with the RAAF as a Flight Officer-Pilot working in the Pacific and USA operating air-sea rescues.

He married Mary Alison Sword in 1949 and together had three sons and a daughter. Warner died in Toowoomba in September 1991.

Public career
Warner won the seat of Toowoomba South for the Country Party at the 1974 Queensland state election, defeating the sitting member Peter Wood of the Labor. He represented the electorate for almost twelve years, retiring from politics in 1986.

Warner was the Speaker of the Legislative Assembly of Queensland from 1983 until 1986.

References

Members of the Queensland Legislative Assembly
1923 births
1991 deaths
National Party of Australia members of the Parliament of Queensland
Speakers of the Queensland Legislative Assembly
20th-century Australian politicians
Royal Australian Air Force personnel of World War II